La Bohème is a 2009 short film from directed by Werner Herzog. The four-minute film features images of life in Ethiopia set to the duet "" from Puccini's opera La bohème, sung by Peter Auty and Mary Plazas. It was part of a series of short films commissioned by Sky Arts and English National Opera.

References

External links 
 

2009 films
2009 short films
2000s Italian-language films
Films directed by Werner Herzog
Italian short films
Films based on La bohème